POV or Pov (ᐱᐅᕖ, piuvii) (pronounced P-O-V) is an Inuit surname officially assigned by non-Inuit officials to Inuit living in or near Puvirnituq (formerly known as Povungnatuk) when a person's second name or last name was too hard or long to write down for someone who did not speak Inuktitut.

Examples
Juani (Angutiguluk) POV (1910-1978), adopted elder brother of Taamusi Qumaq
Abraham (Talirunili) POV (1927-1994), sculptor
Johnny POV (E9-1469) (1908-1978), sculptor. Also known as Johnny Novalinga after the surname of his wife.

See also
Disc number, the identification used for Inuit in the 20th century in lieu of surnames.

References 

Inuit
Inuktitut-language surnames